The Homosexual Law Reform Act 1986 is a New Zealand law that broadly legalised consensual sex between men as well as anal sex between any parties including opposite-sex partners. It removed the provisions of the Crimes Act 1961 that criminalised this behaviour. The law set an age of consent of 16 for sex between men, the same age as for opposite-sex partners.

Background
Buggery or sodomy became illegal in New Zealand when the country became part of the British Empire in 1840 and adopted English law making male homosexual acts punishable by death. The Offences Against The Person Act of 1867 changed the penalty for buggery from execution to life imprisonment. In 1893 the law was broadened so that all sex between men constituted sexual assault even if it was consensual. Penalties included life imprisonment, hard labour and flogging. Sex between women has never been legally prohibited in New Zealand, but all anal intercourse, including heterosexual, continued to be prior to the 1986 Act.

In 1961 the penalties for male homosexual activity were reduced, reflecting changing attitudes towards homosexuality. Shortly afterward the Dorian Society and later the Wolfenden Association were formed to campaign for legalisation of male homosexual sex. In 1968 a petition signed by 75 prominent citizens and calling for legislative change was presented to (and rejected by) parliament.

The first parliamentary attempt at decriminalisation was made in 1974, with National MP Venn Young's Crimes Amendment Bill. This would have legalised sexual activity between men over the age of 21, but was defeated 34 to 29, with 23 abstentions. Warren Freer proposed similar legislation in 1979 and 1980 but this did not receive support from gay activist groups, who felt that a different age of consent for gay and straight sex would perpetuate discrimination and homophobia.

Bill
The Act was introduced by Labour MP Fran Wilde in 1985. The bill originally had two parts. One decriminalised consensual sexual activity between men and consensual heterosexual anal intercourse, while protecting minors of both sexes. The other provided anti-discrimination law protections for lesbians and gay men. The first part passed narrowly (49 Ayes to 44 Noes) on 9 July 1986, after an attempt by opponents to invoke closure and end debate was defeated by one vote the previous week; the bill might have failed if a vote was taken then as several supporters were kept away from Wellington by bad weather. Three National MPs voted for the bill, and other National MPs (including Doug Graham) would have supported the bill if it had been in danger of defeat.

The second part failed, but was incorporated into a supplementary order paper added to the New Zealand Human Rights Act 1993.

Debate
The Act was subject to substantial debate, and faced fierce opposition from Christian political activists such as Keith Hay, Peter Tait and politicians such as Norman Jones (National MP for Invercargill), as well as the Coalition of Concerned Citizens which they created to distribute a petition against the Act. The Coalition of Concerned Citizens presented a petition opposing reform that garnered more than 800,000 signatures, the largest petition in proportion to New Zealand's population up to this point.

While the Coalition of Concerned Citizens threatened electoral reprisals, the Fourth Labour Government was returned for a second term of office, losing only one constituency seat to the National Party Opposition in 1987.

When National MP Lockwood Smith gave his valedictory speech in February 2013 after 30 years in Parliament, he listed voting against the Homosexual Law Reform Bill in 1986 as his biggest regret:

I faced the classic dilemma of voting according to my own judgement or the opinion of those I was elected to represent. As a new member, I opted for the latter and I've always regretted it.

See also

 LGBT in New Zealand
 LGBT rights in New Zealand

References

Bibliography
Laurie Guy: Worlds in Collision: The Gay Law Reform Debate in New Zealand: 1960–1986 Wellington: Victoria University Press: 2002: 
Laurie Guy: "Evangelicals and the Homosexual Law Reform Debate: 1984-5" Stimulus 13:4 (November 2005): 69–77.
History Group, Out and About: Homosexual Law Reform in New Zealand, http://www.nzhistory.net.nz/node/2198.

External links

A history of homosexual law reform in New Zealand (NZHistory.net.nz)
"20 Years Out" radio documentary, Radio New Zealand
Archival audio from homosexual law reform, PrideNZ.com

1986 in New Zealand law
LGBT law in New Zealand
LGBT history in New Zealand
Statutes of New Zealand
1986 in LGBT history
Law reform in New Zealand